The Dongfeng series, typically abbreviated as "DF missiles", are a family of short, medium, intermediate-range and intercontinental ballistic missiles operated by the Chinese People's Liberation Army Rocket Force (formerly the Second Artillery Corps).

History
After the signing of the Sino-Soviet Treaty of Friendship, Alliance and Mutual Assistance in 1950, the Soviet Union assisted China's military R&D with training, technical documentation, manufacturing equipment and licensed production of Soviet weapons.  In the area of ballistic missiles, the Soviets transferred R-1 (SS-1), R-2 (SS-2) and R-11F technology to China.  The first Chinese ballistic missiles were based on Soviet designs.  Since then, China has made many advances in its ballistic missile and rocket technology.  For instance, the space launch Long March rockets have their roots in the Dongfeng missiles.

Dongfeng missiles

Dongfeng 1 (SS-2)
The first of the Dongfeng missiles, the DF-1 (SS-2, initially codenamed '1059', while the 'DF-1' designation was initially assigned to the project which later became DF-3), was a licensed copy of the Soviet R-2 (SS-2 Sibling) short-range ballistic missile (SRBM), based on the German V-2 rocket. The DF-1 had a single RD-101 rocket engine, and used alcohol for fuel with liquid oxygen (LOX) as an oxidizer.  The missile had maximum range of 550 km and a 500 kg payload.  Limited numbers of DF-1 were produced in the 1960s, and have since been retired.

Dongfeng 2 (CSS-1)

The DF-2 (CSS-1) is China's first medium-range ballistic missile (MRBM), with a 1,250 km range and a 15-20 kt nuclear warhead.  It received the western designation of CSS-1 (stands for "China Surface-to-Surface").  It was long noted by the western observers that the DF-2 could be a copy of the Soviet R-5 Pobeda (SS-3 Shyster), as they have identical look, range, engine and payload.  Now it is known that the whole documentation for R-5 had been delivered from Soviet Union to China in the late 1950s.  But some western authors still attribute the entire design to Chinese specialists Xie Guangxuan, Liang Sili, Liu Chuanru, Liu Yuan, Lin Shuang, and Ren Xinmin.  The first DF-2 failed in its launch test in 1962, leading to the improved DF-2A.  The DF-2A was used to carry out China's test of a live warhead on a rocket on 27 October 1966 (detonated in the atmosphere above Lop Nor), and was in operational service since late 1960s.  All DF-2 were retired from active duty in the 1980s.

Dongfeng 3 (CSS-2)

The DF-3 (CSS-2) is often considered China's first "domestic" intermediate-range ballistic missile (IRBM). The common ICBM design was greatly influenced by the Soviet R-14 Chusovaya missile and the first stage engine itself was a direct copy of the С.2.1100/С.2.1150 La-350 booster engine developed by Aleksei Isaev at OKB-2 (NII-88). Design leadership has been attributed to both Tu Shou'e and Sun Jiadong. The missile was produced at Factory 211 (Capital Astronautics Co., [首都航天机械公司], also known as Capital Machine Shop, [首都机械厂]).  The 2,500 km DF-3 was originally designed with a 2,000 kg payload to carry an atomic (later thermonuclear) warhead.  A further improved DF-3A with 3,000 km range (~4,000 km with reduced payload) was developed in 1981, and exported to Saudi Arabia with a conventional high-explosive warhead. The DF-3's range of 2,810 km means it is just short of being able to target Guam, although the 2012 DOD report on China's military power states that they have a range of 3,300 km, which would be enough to target Guam. The 2013 Pentagon report on China's military power confirms the DF-3's 3,300 km range, and its maps show Guam being within the DF-3's range. All DF-3/DF-3A's were retired by the mid-2010s and replaced by the DF-21.

Dongfeng 4 (CSS-3)

The DF-4 (CSS-3) "Chingyu" is China's first two-stage ballistic missile, with 5,550-7,000 km range and 2,200 kg payload (3 Mt nuclear warhead).  It was developed in late 1960s to provide strike capability against Moscow and Guam.  The DF-4 missile also served as basis for China's first space launch vehicle, Chang Zheng 1 (Long March 1).  Approx. 20 DF-4's remain in service, and are scheduled to be replaced by DF-31 by 2010–2015.

Dongfeng 5 (CSS-4)

The DF-5 (CSS-4) is an intercontinental ballistic missile (ICBM), designed to carry a 3 megaton (Mt) nuclear warhead to distance up to 12,000 km.  The DF-5 is a silo-based, two-stage missile, and its rocket served as the basis for the space-launch vehicle Fengbao-Tempest (FB-1) used to launch satellites.  The missile was developed in the 1960s, but did not enter service until 1981.  An improved variant, the DF-5A, was produced in the mid 1990s with improved range (>13,000 km).  Currently, an estimated 24-36 DF-5A's are in service as China's primary ICBM force. If the DF-5A is launched from the eastern part of the Qinghai province, it can reach cities like Los Angeles, Sacramento and San Francisco. If it is launched from the most eastern parts of northeastern provinces, it can cover all of the mainland of the United States.

Dongfeng 11 (CSS-7)

The DF-11 (CSS-7, also M-11 for export),  is a road-mobile SRBM designed by Wang Zhenhua at the Sanjiang Missile Corporation (also known as the 066 Base) in the late 1970s.  Unlike previous Chinese ballistic missiles, the DF-11 use solid fuel, which greatly reduces launch preparation time to around 15–30 minutes, while liquid-fuelled missiles such as the DF-5 require up to 2 hours of pre-launch preparation.  The DF-11 has a range of 300 km and an 800 kg payload.  An improved DF-11A version has increased range of >825 km. The range of the M-11 does not violate the limits set by the Missile Technology Control Regime (MTCR). Estimates on the number of DF-11s in service vary between 500 and 600.

Dongfeng 12 (CSS-X-15)
The DF-12 (CSS-X-15) is an SRBM formerly known as the M20. The change in designation signalled a shift in fielding to the Second Artillery Corps, making it possible the missile could be armed with a tactical nuclear warhead. Images of it bear a resemblance to the Russian 9K720 Iskander missile which, although not purchased by China from Russia, could have been acquired from former Soviet states. Like the Iskander, the DF-12 reportedly has built-in countermeasures including terminal maneuverability to survive against missile defense systems. With guidance provided by inertial navigation and Beidou, accuracy is 30 meters CEP; since the missile is controlled throughout the entire flight path, it can be re-targeted mid-flight. They are fired from an 8×8 transporter erector launcher (TEL) that holds two missiles.

An anti-ship ballistic missile export variant of the M20, called A/MGG-20B (M20B), was unveiled at the 2018 Zhuhai Airshow.

Dongfeng 15 (CSS-6)

The DF-15 (CSS-6, also M-9 for export) was developed by the China Aerospace Science and Technology Corporation (CASC, previously known as the 5th Aerospace Academy)'s Academy of Rocket Motor Technology (ARMT, also known as the 4th Academy).  The missile is a single-stage, solid-fuel SRBM with a 600 km range and a 500 kg payload.  During the 1995-1996 Taiwan strait crisis, the PLA launched six DF-15's near the country of Taiwan in an "exercise" to demonstrate the missile's capability.  Although the DF-15 is marketed for export, its range would violate the Missile Technology Control Regime (MTCR) agreement, and thus no DF-15 has been exported to date.  Approximately 300-350 DF-15's are in service with the PLA Rocket Force.

Dongfeng 16 (CSS-11) 

The DF-16 (CSS-11) is a new-model missile that has a longer range than the DF-15 (between ). A Taiwan official announced on 16 March 2011 that Taiwan believed China had begun deploying the missiles. The DF-16 represents an increased threat to Taiwan because it is more difficult to intercept for anti-ballistic missiles systems such as the MIM-104 Patriot PAC-3.  Due to its increased range, the missile has to climb to higher altitudes before descending, giving more time for gravity to accelerate it on re-entry, faster than a PAC-3 could effectively engage it. The DF-16 is an MRBM longer and wider than previous models with a  warhead and 5-10 meter accuracy.  Its bi-conic warhead structure leaves room for potential growth to include specialized terminally guided and deep penetrating warheads.  It is launched from a 10×10 wheeled TEL similar to that of the DF-21, but instead of a "cold launch" missile storage tube it uses a new protective "shell" to cover the missile. Nuclear capable.

The missile was shown to the public during the 2015 China Victory Day Parade in Beijing celebrating 70-year anniversary of the end of World War II.

Dongfeng 17 

The DF-17 is a type of ballistic missile specifically designed to carry a hypersonic glide vehicle, such as DF-ZF. its estimated range is 1,800-2,000 km, and reached initial operational capability in 2019. It will be capable of delivering both nuclear and conventional payloads, as well as a maneuverable reentry vehicle instead of an HGV. The first test of the DF-17 ballistic missile took place on 1 November 2017.

Dongfeng 21 (CSS-5)

The DF-21 (CSS-5) is a two-stage, solid-fuel MRBM developed by the 2nd Aerospace Academy (now China Changfeng Mechanics and Electronics Technology Academy) in late 1970s.  It was the first solid-fuelled ballistic missile deployed by the Second Artillery Corp.  The missile carries a single 500 kt nuclear warhead, with up to  range.  The DF-21 also served as the basis for the submarine-launched ballistic missile (SLBM) JL-1 (CSS-N-3), used on the Xia-class SSBN.  In 1996, an improved variant, the DF-21A, was introduced.  As of 2010, 60-80 DF-21/DF-21A were estimated to be in service; this number may have increased since then. Sources say Saudi Arabia bought a DF-21 in 2007.

The latest variant, the DF-21D, has a maximum range exceeding 1,450 kilometres (900 mi; 780 nmi) according to the U.S. National Air and Space Intelligence Center.  It is hailed as the world's first anti-ship ballistic missile (ASBM) system, capable of targeting a moving carrier strike group from long-range, land-based mobile launchers.  The DF-21D is thought to employ maneuverable reentry vehicles (MaRVs) with a terminal guidance system.  It may have been tested in 2005–2006, and the launch of the Jianbing-5/YaoGan-1 and Jianbing-6/YaoGan-2 satellites offering targeting information from synthetic aperture radar (SAR) and visual imaging respectively.

Dongfeng 25

Development was allegedly cancelled in 1996. The U.S. Department of Defense in its 2013 report to Congress on China's military developments made no mention of the DF-25 as a missile in service.

Dongfeng 26

The DF-26C is an IRBM with a range of at least , far enough to reach U.S. naval bases in Guam.  Few details are known, but it is believed to be solid-fuelled and road-mobile, allowing it to be stored in underground bunkers and fired at short notice, hence difficult to counter.  It is possible that the DF-26C is a follow-up version of the DF-21.  Possible warheads include conventional, nuclear or even maneuverable anti-ship and hypersonic glide warheads.

Dongfeng 31 (CSS-10)

The DF-31 (CSS-10) is China's newest road-mobile, solid-fuel ICBM developed by the 4th Aerospace Academy (now ARMT).  The DF-31 has range of 8,000+ km, and can carry a single 1,000 kt warhead, or up to three 20-150 kt MIRV warheads.  An improved version, the DF-31A, has range of 11,000+ km, far enough to reach Los Angeles from Beijing. The DF-31 was developed to replace many of China's older ballistic missiles, and served as basis to the new JL-2 (CSS-NX-4/CSS-NX-5) SLBM.  In 2009, approx. 30 DF-31/DF-31A are estimated to be in service; it is possible this number may have increased since then. 12 were displayed at the 2009 military parade in Beijing commemorating the 60th anniversary of the PRC's founding.

The latest variant DF-31AG was displayed at the 2019 parade taking place in Beijing celebrating the 70th anniversary of PRC.

Dongfeng 41 (CSS-20)

The DF-41 (CSS-20), capable of being armed with ten or twelve MIRV warheads, is China's newest addition to its nuclear arsenal. With an estimated range between 12,000 - 15,000 km, it is believed to surpass the range of the US's LGM-30 Minuteman ICBM to become the world's longest range missile.

References

Citations

Sources 

 Saudi Arabia unveils part of strategic missile force - a deterrent move against Iran?
 Artillery: Saudi Ballistic Missiles Secretly Upgraded
 Exclusive: CIA Helped Saudis in Secret Chinese Missile Deal

External links
 
 Ballistic Missiles of China
 Global Security
 Sino Defense Today

Ballistic missiles of the People's Republic of China
Cold War weapons of China